The Moto 360 (2nd generation), also known as the Moto 360 (2015), is an Android Wear-based smartwatch. It was announced on September 14, 2015 at the IFA.

It was discontinued by Motorola in February 2017.

Design and hardware
The Moto 360 (2nd generation) has a circular design, similar to the Huawei Watch and LG Watch Urbane, with 42mm diameter options. The case is stainless steel and available in several different finishes. Removable wrist bands are available in metal and Horween leather, and more readily removable than those of the previous generation.

The device has an "all-day" battery which Motorola claims to last longer than that of the previous generation Moto 360.  Like the previous watch, the 2nd generation Moto 360 charges wirelessly by being placed on an included cradle. It has dual microphones for voice recognition and noise rejection and a vibration motor allowing tactile feedback. An ambient light sensor optimizes screen brightness and allows gesture controls such as dimming the screen by placing one's hand over it. Bluetooth 4.0 LE is included for connectivity and wireless accessories.

Like the previous generation, its ambient light sensor is located below the main display. A PPG and 9-axis accelerometer enable health and activity monitoring. It has IP67 certification for dust resistance and fresh water resistance rated at 30-minutes at 1 meter (4 feet) depth.

Software
As of early 2017, the Moto 360 runs Android Wear 1.5, Google's Android-based platform specifically designed for wearable devices and Android Marshmallow 6.0.1 and pairs with any phone running Android 4.3 or higher.  Also compatible with iPhone iOS v9+ when paired with Android Wear app for iOS . Its software displays notifications from paired phones. It uses paired phones to enable interactive features such as Google Now cards, search, navigation, playing music, and integration with apps such as Google Fit, Evernote, and others.

The last supported version of the software is Android Wear 2.0

Price
The starting price was US$300.

Reception 
Impressions of the Moto 360 were generally positive, especially in comparison to its predecessor, however the limitations of Android Wear concerned some critics. In contrasting the industrial design with the software, Dan Seifert of The Verge noted "if you buy the Moto 360 smartwatch, you’re paying more for the watch than you are for the smart". The Guardian gave the device four out of five stars, concluding that "it’s no more capable than almost any other Android Wear watch" despite having "fluid performance" and being more comfortable than the first generation.

See also
 Moto 360 (1st generation)
 Wearable computer
 Microsoft Band
 Apple Watch

References

External links

Android (operating system) devices
Products introduced in 2015
Wear OS devices
Smartwatches
Motorola products